Uldazepam is a drug which is a benzodiazepine derivative. It has sedative and anxiolytic effects similar to those of other benzodiazepines.

Synthesis
Thio thionamide is even more prone to amidine formation than the lactam itself.

Reaction of thionamide (2) with O-allyl-hydroxylamine gave the oximino (3) uldazepam.

See also
Benzodiazepine

References

Allyl compounds
Benzodiazepines
Chloroarenes
GABAA receptor positive allosteric modulators